Muntendam is a village in the municipality of Midden-Groningen, in the Dutch province of Groningen.

Until 1990 it was a separate municipality, which boasted the title 'reddest (most socialist) municipality in the Netherlands', with a council of 11 containing  7 PvdA (Labour Party) members and 2 CPN (Communist Party) members. (However, nearby Reiderland had had a vast CPN majority since WWII, so the claim is rather too strong). When a new mayor had to be appointed in 1980 (at the time a municipality had no say in the matter), it was assumed that it would become a PvdA mayor as it had always been. However, the then minister of the interior, Hans Wiegel of the right-wing VVD, decided that this very left-wing part of the Netherlands needed a change and appointed a D66 (left of centre) mayor. This led to a cold reception and the first time a Dutch mayor was not officially inaugurated. Over time, however, people started to like him and when he moved to a bigger municipality there was even an action to keep him (to no avail). Not much later, the method of appointing a mayor in the Netherlands was changed, with the municipality putting up a request which is usually followed.

Gallery

References

External links
 

Populated places in Groningen (province)
Former municipalities of Groningen (province)
Midden-Groningen